The 1984–85 Minnesota North Stars season was the North Stars' 18th season.

Coached by Bill Mahoney (3–8–2) and Glen Sonmor (22–35–10), the team compiled a record of 25–43–12 for 62 points, to finish the regular season 4th in the Norris Division. In the playoffs they won the division semi-finals 3–0 over the St. Louis Blues, but lost the division finals 4–2 to the Chicago Black Hawks.

Offseason

Regular season

Final standings

Schedule and results

Playoffs

Player statistics

Awards and records

Transactions

Draft picks
Minnesota's draft picks at the 1984 NHL Entry Draft held at the Montreal Forum in Montreal, Quebec.

Farm teams

See also
1984–85 NHL season

References

External links

Minnesota North Stars seasons
Minnesota North Stars
Minnesota North Stars
Minnesota Twins
Minnesota Twins